Juan Manuel Fernández Pacheco y Zúñiga, Duke of Escalona and Marquess of Villena (Marcilla, Navarre, 7 September 1650 – Madrid, 29 June 1725), was a Spanish aristocrat, politician, and academician who founded the Royal Spanish Academy.

Biography 
Duke Juan Manuel Fernández, Duke of Escalona, Marquess of Villena, 12th Count of San Esteban de Gormaz, 8th Count of Xiquena was the son of Diego López Pacheco, 7th Duke of Escalona (1599–1653) and his second wife Juana María Francisca de Zuñiga (died 1652). He served as Mayordomo mayor to the king, viceroy, and captain-general of the Kingdoms of Navarre, Aragon, Catalonia, Sicily and Naples, and, on 9 October 1687, was awarded the title of Knight of the Order of the Golden Fleece.
In 1694 he lost the Battle of Torroella against the invading French and, during the War of the Spanish Succession, was imprisoned in Gaeta, Naples, by the Austrian empire, after losing the Siege of Gaeta (1707). Upon his release and return to Spain, he founded—under orders of King Philip V—the Royal Spanish Academy (Real Academia Española (RAE)). He was elected its first lifetime director in 1713.

Marriage and children 
on 29 September 1674 he married María Josefa de Benavides Silva y Manrique de Lara, daughter of Diego de Benavides, 8th Count of Santisteban. They had 2 sons: 
 Mercurio López Pacheco y Benavides, (Escalona 9 May 1679 -  Madrid 7 June 1738), the 9th Duke of Escalona and many other titles and also the lifetime 2nd director of the RAE (1725–1738).
 Marciano Fernández Pacheco (1688-1743)

References

|-

|-

|-

1650 births
1725 deaths
Viceroys of Aragon
Viceroys of Catalonia
Viceroys of Naples
Viceroys of Navarre
Viceroys of Sicily
Counts of San Esteban de Gormaz
Counts of Spain
108
Marquesses of Spain
108
Knights of the Golden Fleece
Knights of Santiago
Spanish politicians
Members of the Royal Spanish Academy
Captains General of Catalonia
Grandees of Spain
17th-century Spanish nobility
18th-century Spanish nobility